The 1908 Penn Quakers football team was an American football team that represented the University of Pennsylvania as an independent during the 1908 college football season. In their first season under head coach Sol Metzger, the Quakers compiled an 11–0–1 record, shut out seven of twelve opponents, and outscored all opponents by a total of 215 to 28.

There was no contemporaneous system in 1908 for determining a national champion. However, Penn was retroactively named as the national champion by the Helms Athletic Foundation, Houlgate System, and Parke H. Davis, and as a co-national champion by the National Championship Foundation.

Two Penn players, halfback Bill Hollenback and end Hunter Scarlett, were consensus picks on the 1908 All-America college football team. Both were later inducted into the College Football Hall of Fame, Hollenback in 1951 and Scarlett in 1970. Other notable players included quarterback Allie Miller and tackle Dexter Draper.

Schedule

References

Penn
Penn Quakers football seasons
College football national champions
College football undefeated seasons
Penn Quakers football